Daju may refer to:

 Daju languages, a group of Nilo-Saharan languages spoken by the Daju people
 Daju people, an ethnic group of Sudan
 Daju (town), a town in Lijiang Prefecture, Yunnan Province, China